Umeå (locally ;; ; ;) is a city in northeast Sweden. It is the seat of Umeå Municipality and the capital of Västerbotten County.

Situated on the Ume River, Umeå is the largest locality in Norrland and the thirteenth largest in Sweden, with a wider municipal population of 130,224 inhabitants in 2020. When Umeå University was established in 1965, growth accelerated, and the amount of housing has doubled in 30 years from 1980 to 2010. , Umeå was gaining around 1000 inhabitants per year and the municipality plans for having 200 000 inhabitants by 2050. The projection of municipality size in 2050 has, however, been questioned as an overestimation in an independent study.

Umeå is a university town and centre of education, technical and medical research in northern Sweden. The two universities located in the city, Umeå University and one of the 3 main branches of SLU, host around 40,000 enrolled students, which corresponds to around 30% of the total population. CRISPR gene editing was developed by researchers at Umeå University, being awarded the 2020 Nobel Prize in Chemistry. Umeå was the European Capital of Culture during 2014, along with Riga in Latvia.

Consulates from ten countries can be found in Umeå (2021): Denmark (from 1848), Finland (from 1921), France (from 1989), Iceland (from 2002), Italy (from 2012), Latvia (1939–1940; again from 2014), Lithuania (from 2012), Norway (from 1963), and the Republic of Seychelles (from 2001).

Umeå has been the home of Rally Sweden since 2022.

History 
The first written mention of Umeå is from the 14th century. The northern parts of Sweden, including the counties of Västerbotten and Norrbotten, were mostly settled by nomadic Sami people before this time but not necessarily forming any permanent settlement in the city's exact location. The name is believed to be derived from the Old Norse word Úma which means roaring. The name of the town would therefore mean "The Roaring River".

The coast came to be permanently settled by Germanic peoples moving upwards on the Bothnian Bay by boat, hence the Germanic names of towns and villages on the Westrobothnian coast. Southern Westrobothnia (Umeå and Skellefteå) has been a permanent Germanic settlement since at least the 14th century, but probably since the Viking ages or earlier.

Umeå in its first form was a parish with a wooden church and trade post located in the section of town now known as Backen (or Kyrkbacken). Its location near the coast and on a river was probably one of the reasons that people chose to settle there.

For the next couple of centuries, Umeå was a place consisting of scattered parishes, where merchandise originating with the Sami people was traded, and was the last inhabited place before the northern wilderness took over. However, no real city was built at the location selected by the king, and it lost its town privileges in the 1590s.

In 1622, a city was again founded by Gustavus Adolphus of Sweden. In 1638, it had about 40 houses. It suffered from Russian attacks in 1714 and in 1720 when it was burnt to the ground during the Russian Pillage of 1719–21. At the close of the Finnish War in 1809 the Russian army under Barclay de Tolly took Umeå and held it from June to August.

In 1874 the town improved the plans for its structure after it became a government requirement. Umeå had already started making these changes when on 25 June 1888, a fire devastated the eastern parts of Umeå and at least 2,300 of the 3,000 inhabitants became homeless. In the restoration following the fire, almost 3,000 silver birch trees were planted along wide avenues to prevent future fires from spreading. For this reason Umeå is sometimes known as "Björkarnas Stad", the "City of Birches". The name of the Umeå ice-hockey team, Björklöven, means "The Birch Leaves".

Geography 

Umeå is situated on the inlet of the Gulf of Bothnia at the mouth of the Ume River, in the south of Västerbotten. It is the largest city north of the Stockholm-Uppsala region, and is sometimes referred to as the regional centre of northern Sweden.

The nearby community of Holmsund serves as its port. From here a ferry line connects it with the neighbouring city of Vaasa (Swedish: Vasa) in Finland. The near connections to Finland affects the population of the city – several Sweden Finns live in Umeå.

Residential areas and localities

Central
 Berghem
 Centrum
 Fridhem
 Gammlia
 Haga
 Sandbacka
 Umestan
 Väst på stan
 Öbacka
 Öbacka Strand
 Östermalm
 Öst på stan

West
 Backen
 Grisbacka
 Grubbe
 Klockarbäcken
 Kronoparken
 Kungsänget
 Lundåkern
 Rödäng
 Sandåkern
 Umedalen
 Västerslätt
 Västerhiske 
 Ytterhiske

South
 Alvik
 Böle
 Böleäng
 Röbäck
 Röbäcksdalen
 Söderslätt
 Teg
 Ön

Southeast
 Carlshem
 Carlshöjd
 Carlslid
 Gimonäs
 Lilljansberget
 Sofiehem
 Tavleliden
 Tomtebo
 Tunnelbacken
 Universitetsområdet
 Ålidbacken
 Ålidhem
 Ålidhöjd

North/Northeast
 Ersboda
 Ersmark
 Marieberg
 Mariedal
 Mariehem
 Mariestrand
 Nydalahöjd
 Olofsdal
 Sandahöjd

Climate 
Umeå has a subarctic climate (Dfc), bordering on a humid continental climate (Dfb) with short and fairly warm summers. Winters are lengthy and freezing but usually milder than in areas at the same latitude with a more continental climate.

Considering its proximity to a major water body and its latitude, summers are warmer than would be expected.

Demography 

The population of Umeå has grown consistently since the 1960s, when the university was built. In part because of the university, the town has attracted many residents from outside of Sweden, as well as students from other regions of Sweden.

As of 2015, 10.4% of the population in the municipality of Umeå were foreign-born. The largest national origin group is from Finland, followed by Iraq, Iran and Somalia.

In April 2017 the Jewish association in Umeå closed after receiving multiple threats from neo-Nazis, allegedly associated with the Nordic Resistance Movement.

Transportation 

The road infrastructure includes two European highways (E4 and E12) which pass the city. The local bus system is centred at Vasaplan in the city centre, and has multiple routes travelling throughout the city. About  from the city centre is Umeå Airport. It is the 7th largest airport in Sweden by number of passengers, with 844,932 passengers in 2010.

The Bothnia Line (Botniabanan) connects to Umeå from the south, it runs along the High Coast via Örnsköldsvik to Umeå. This railway was opened on 28 August 2010. It provides Umeå with a fast train connection to Stockholm ( hours). A new railway station, Umeå East Station, was built in connection to Norrland's University Hospital and Umeå University.

The Wasaline ferry takes four hours to arrive at Vaasa, Finland.

Umeå is located along the Blue Highway, which is an international tourist route from Mo i Rana, Norway to Pudozh, Russia via Finland.

Culture 
The Opera of northern Sweden, the Norrland Opera, is based in the city, as is the English-language non-profit Umeå Theatre Company and the Museum of Contemporary Art and Visual Culture. The annual Umeå Jazz Festival is one of the larger Scandinavian festivals for modern jazz.

Well-known metal bands from Umeå include Cult of Luna, Gotham City, Hollow, Meshuggah, Mexicoma, Nocturnal Rites, Refused, and Persuader. During the 1990s, the influence of Umeå hardcore punk bands such as Final Exit, Step Forward, Refused, Abhinanda, Shield and Doughnuts and the local labels Desperate Fight Records and Busted Heads Records led to the growth of Umeå's hardcore scene. Independent record label Ny Våg is headquartered in Umeå, and have released records of Umeå artists such as AC4, Masshysteri and Invasionen.

In 2009 the town was designated European Capital of Culture for 2014, along with Riga.

Umeå is the centre of television in northern Sweden; SVT Nord and TV4's northern region office are both based in the city. The main newspapers of the county of Västerbotten, Västerbottens-Kuriren and Västerbottens Folkblad are also based in Umeå.

The background and setting for the video game Unravel are based on landscapes around Umeå.

Sports 

The city of Umeå currently hosts four major sports clubs. The women's football club is Umeå IK. The men's hockey team IF Björklöven was very successful in the 1980s but has been less successful in recent years. Björklöven are currently playing in the Swedish second-tier league HockeyAllsvenskan while Umeå IK plays in the top Swedish women's football league Damallsvenskan. IBK Dalen and IKSU are among the major floorball teams in Sweden; both teams has been in the Swedish Championships finals two years in a row.
Other sports clubs include IFK Umeå, Mariehem SK, Umeå FC, and Umedalens IF.

In 2018 and 2020, Umeå was named Sweden's best sports city by SVT Sport.

In 2011, a baseball and softball team, Umeå Baseboll & Softbol|klubb, was founded. The team has 2 former national team players as coaches and currently plays in Norra Regionserien.

Education and research 
In 1951 the city's library was recognised as important for northern Sweden. The library is given a copy of every new book printed in Sweden. Umeå University has about 37,000 students and 4,200 staff. The establishment of the university in the mid-1960s led to a population expansion from about 50,000 inhabitants to today's 121,032. The expansion continues, with about 1100 new inhabitants every year, and has made Umeå a modern, somewhat intellectual city to add to the traditional basis of heavy industry for cities along the coast of northern Sweden (Norrland).

The Swedish University of Agricultural Sciences or Sveriges Lantbruksuniversitet is a university in Sweden. Although its head office is located in Uppsala (Ultuna), the university has several campuses in different parts of Sweden, including Umeå. Unlike other government-run universities in Sweden, it is funded through the budget for the Ministry of Enterprise and Innovation.

The university hospital serves the entire region of northern Sweden.

Economy 
Key research fields of the University are life sciences (especially medical and cell and the molecular biology of plants), human-technology interaction, social welfare, ecology and gender perspectives.

The Umeå University works collaboratively with companies such as ABB, Volvo, Skanska, Ericsson, and Öhrlings PricewaterhouseCoopers (PwC).

The Swedish University of Agricultural Sciences (SLU) in Umeå, with Umeå Plant Science Centre, is another major site of research and education.

Notable companies based in Umeå include:
 GE Healthcare, which produces chromatography systems such as FPLC, HPLC and DNA sequencer equipment.
 Handelsbanken, HQ in the northern region of Sweden.
 Komatsu Forest, European HQ.
 Siemens Financial Services, Scandinavian HQ.
 Volvo Trucks.
 Nasdaq Technology AB
, production facilities for tractor front-end loaders.

Notable people 

Athletes
 Sebastian Aho
 Björn Berg
 Jesper Blomqvist
 Jörgen Brink
 Åsa Elfving
 Per Elofsson
 Fredrik Ericsson
 Carl Grundström
 Hanna Ljungberg
 Mikael Lustig
 Gunnar Nordahl
 Maria Pietilä Holmner
 Anja Pärson
 Assar Rönnlund
 Patrik Sundström
 Daniel Tjärnqvist
 Tor Troéng
 Marcus Wallmark

Musicians
 Karl Backman
 Katarina Barruk
 Eva Dahlgren
 Mats Gustafsson 
 Frida Hyvönen
 Inge Johansson
 Daniel Lindström
 Dennis Lyxzén
 Lisa Miskovsky
 Nicklas Nygren
 David Sandström
 Kristofer Steen
 Tove Styrke
 Morgan Ågren
 Fricky 
 Infernus
 Fredrik Thordendal/Meshuggah

Politicians
 Ibrahim Baylan
 Kjell-Olof Feldt
 Jonas Sjöstedt
 Ola Ullsten

Other
 Stieg Larsson, novelist
 Stig Lindberg, artist
 David Sandberg, film director and actor
 Amanda Kernell, film director and screenwriter
 Forsen, video game streamer
 Vargskelethor Joel, video game streamer

See also 
 Blue Highway, an international tourist route from Norway to Russia via Sweden and Finland
 Umea Region

Notes

References

External links 

 Website of Umeå municipality
 Umeå Capital of Culture 2014
 Umeå Region
 Umeå Tourist Office

 
County seats in Sweden
Municipal seats of Västerbotten County
Swedish municipal seats
Populated places in Umeå Municipality
Populated places established in 1622
Cities in Västerbotten County